Ivan Prskalo (born 29 March 1995)  is a Bosnian Croat footballer who plays as a forward for Reynir Sandgerði.

Club career
A native of Čitluk, and the son of the former Prva HNL player Marijo Prskalo, Prskalo started his career at the local lower-tier side NK Međugorje, before moving to GNK Dinamo Zagreb, aged 14. He remained at the club until the summer of 2012, when he moved to the academy of their rivals HNK Hajduk Split, the team which he supports. He established himself as a first-team regular for the U19 side, becoming the top scorer of the Prva HNL Academy U19 league for the 2013/14 season with 17 goals.

During the 2014–15 season he established himself as a regular in Hajduk's Treća HNL reserve team, before making his Prva HNL debut, coming in the 82. minute of the 2-1 home win against NK Osijek for Dejan Mezga.

Sent on loan to the Druga HNL side NK Sesvete he made a strong start to the season with 7 goals scored in the first 9 games. He was called back to Hajduk during the winter preparations of 2016, but he played only 2 games during the spring part of the season. On 7 June 2016, his contract with Hajduk was terminated and after a trial period he joined HNK Cibalia.

References

External links

1995 births
Living people
Čitluk
Association football forwards
Bosnia and Herzegovina footballers
Bosnia and Herzegovina under-21 international footballers
Croatian footballers
HNK Hajduk Split players
HNK Hajduk Split II players
NK Sesvete players
HNK Cibalia players
HNK Gorica players
NK Imotski players
NK Solin players
NK GOŠK Gabela players
Njarðvík FC players
NK Neretva players
Reynir Sandgerði men's football players
Croatian Football League players
First Football League (Croatia) players
Premier League of Bosnia and Herzegovina players
1. deild karla players
2. deild karla players
Croatian expatriate footballers
Expatriate footballers in Switzerland
Croatian expatriate sportspeople in Switzerland
Expatriate footballers in Bosnia and Herzegovina
Croatian expatriate sportspeople in Bosnia and Herzegovina
Expatriate footballers in Iceland
Croatian expatriate sportspeople in Iceland